Christopher Joel "Kipp" Lennon (born March 12, 1960) is an American musician, songwriter, and actor. Lennon is a founding member of the folk rock band Venice. His role in the band includes performing as a lead vocalist and percussionist. Kipp Lennon has also been a member of the progressive rock act Ambrosia since 2021 and currently tours with the group.

Early and personal life
Lennon was born in Venice, California, the son of William and Isabelle Lennon. His given name is Christopher. The explanation he gives for his nickname is: "When I was brought home from the hospital as a brand new baby, March 1960, everyone was calling me 'Chrissy', like people do with newborns. You add an 'e' or 'y' or whatever to their name as an instant nickname. Okay, so my brother Joe was three years old, and he couldn't say 'Chrissy', and kept saying 'Kippy'. My brother Dan, who was ten, thought that was hilarious, and from that day on, literally my first day at home, I was dubbed Kippy, never to be called Christopher again except by doctors, teachers, cops, and my mom if she was mad at me." Lennon is the youngest brother of the popular female quartet The Lennon Sisters, who rose to fame on The Lawrence Welk Show and continued a successful singing career in the subsequent decades.

When Lennon was nine years old, he and his family endured the shooting death of their father, William. Chet Young, a stalker who believed himself to be married to Kipp's sister Peggy (of The Lennon Sisters), felt that the father stood in the way and had to be eliminated. Lying in wait, Young shot him in the parking lot of the Marina Del Rey golf course and two months later, used the same gun to commit suicide. The family later discovered an unopened letter having a cutout of Mr. Lennon, a picture of a gun pointed at his head, and the words "High Noon" (the time of the murder).

Career

Music
Venice was founded in 1977; the band was initially founded by Lennon and his cousin Michael Lennon. The following year Michael's brother Mark joined, with Kipp's brother Pat joining in 1980. Since that time, the two pairs of cousins have performed and released 13 albums and other works since 1986. Kipp plays percussion and writes songs for the band.  He performed with the rest of the band on their live DVD, Venice, Live at the Royal Carre Theater. He also sings for the Pine Mountain Logs, a band containing many of the members of Venice and playing only cover versions of rock songs.

Additionally, Lennon released one solo album, Boom Boom Party (CBS/Sony), in 1987. Lennon sang with David Crosby on his solo album Thousand Roads, and also performed vocals for the song "Suspension," which was the main title of the 1979 theatrical pilot of Buck Rogers in the 25th Century.

In September 2010, Lennon joined Roger Waters' the Wall Live tour, singing backup vocals.

Lennon joined the classic “yacht” rock band Ambrosia on lead vocals in 2021 replacing Ken Stacey who exited in 2020.

Film
Although Kipp Lennon did not appear in the 1987 Disney movie Double Switch, he did perform the vocals for the songs used in the soundtrack, "Turn up the Radio", "All Day, All Night", and "One Step Closer".

Lennon also sang the theme songs to C.H.U.D. II: Bud the C.H.U.D. (1989) and the theatrical pilot of Buck Rogers in the 25th Century (1979).

Lennon sang "Secret Agent Man" in the movie Can't Buy Me Love.

He also sang for the actor John Scott Clough in the Sidney Poitier-directed dance/musical film Fast Forward.

Television roles
Lennon has contributed to several episodes of The Simpsons: in season 3's "Stark Raving Dad", although Michael Jackson (credited as "John Jay Smith") performed the speaking part of Leon Kompowsky, a character who pretended he was Michael Jackson, Lennon sang the songs due to contractual obligations from Jackson with his record company at the time. Most notably he sang the song "Happy Birthday Lisa," written by Jackson within the episode. He also provides Jackson's singing voice in The Jacksons: An American Dream. Lennon returned as Kompowsky to sing the extra verses Bart wrote for his sister in season 29's "Mr. Lisa's Opus".

Lennon also sang the songs "Flaming Moe's" (a spoof of the theme song from the TV series Cheers) in the episode of the same name, "The Sound of Grandpa" from "Lady Bouvier's Lover", and "Raindrops Keep Fallin' on My Head" from "Duffless". He sang the original song "I'm Checking In" featured in the Betty Ford musical in "The City of New York vs. Homer Simpson".

In addition to The Simpsons, Lennon voiced Michael Jackstone on The Flintstone Kids' Just Say No Special, and various roles in The Story of Santa Claus, The Fall Guy,  Eight Is Enough, and the TV series of Herbie the Love Bug.

References

External links
Lennon's band Venice official website

1960 births
American rock singers
American rock songwriters
American male singer-songwriters
Sony BMG artists
Singer-songwriters from California
Living people